Wyoming Highway 135 (WYO 135) is a  north–south Wyoming State Road in Fremont County.

Route description
Wyoming Highway 135 begins its southern end at US Route 287/Wyoming Highway 789 at Sweetwater Station northwest of Jeffrey City. Highway 135, named Sand Draw Road, travels north from Sweetwater Station towards the small oil community of Sand Draw. At 17 miles, approximately half-way through its route, Wyoming Highway 139 is intersected which acts as a spur into the community of Sand Draw. Past Sand Draw, WYO 135 heads now more north-northwest toward Riverton as it passes through the Wind River Basin. Nearing 34.5 miles, the western terminus of Wyoming Highway 136 (Gas Hills Road) is intersected which travels east towards the Gas Hills Mining District. Just after meeting WYO 136, Highway 135 crosses the Little Wind River and reaches its northern terminus at Wyoming Highway 789 just south of Riverton. 

Wyoming Highway 135 provides an alternate to Wyoming Highway 789 through Lander.

Major intersections

References

External links 

Wyoming State Routes 100-199
WYO 135 - US-287/WYO 789 to WYO 139
WYO 135 - WYO 139 to WYO 136
WYO 135 - WYO 136 to WYO 789
Wyoming Highway 135 - Sand Draw Road

Transportation in Fremont County, Wyoming
135